is a Japanese voice actor. Some of his major roles include Hol Horse in JoJo's Bizarre Adventure: Stardust Crusaders, Yūshi Oshitari in The Prince of Tennis, Kenzo Tenma in Monster, Ren Honjo in Nana, Hei in Darker than Black, Shisui Uchiha in Naruto Shippuden and Dad (Mr Yamada) in Chi's Sweet Home. He began as a stage actor when one of his seniors got him to do voice acting. He has taken lead roles such as Jose in Gunslinger Girl and Ramsbeckite Hematite  in Cluster Edge. In 2008, he was the first Japanese voice actor to guest at an anime convention in Australia.

Filmography

Anime television

Tokusatsu

Anime Films

Video Games

Overseas dubbing

References

External links
  
 

1969 births
Male voice actors from Kobe
Japanese male video game actors
Japanese male voice actors
Living people
20th-century Japanese male actors
21st-century Japanese male actors